Alex Bradley (born ), is a New Zealand rugby union footballer. His regular playing position is No. 8. He plays for the Chiefs in Super Rugby and Waikato in the ITM Cup.

References

External links 
Chiefs profile
Waikato profile
Yahoo NZ profile
itsrugby.co.uk profile

Living people
1981 births
New Zealand rugby union players
Chiefs (rugby union) players
Waikato rugby union players
Rugby union number eights
People from Morrinsville
Rugby union players from Waikato